Konkuk University is a South Korean private university founded in 1946. The university was founded based on three virtues: sincerity, fidelity, and righteousness.

Konkuk University gives comprehensive education in agricultural and life science research to around 30,000 students, plus 2,500 international students. It has two campuses: one in Seoul and one in Chungju. The Seoul campus is located in the southeastern part of the city, near the Han River, and is served by the Konkuk University Station.

History

The university was founded in 1946 by Dr. Yoo Seok-chang (pen name: Sanghuh). It was originally known as the Chosun School of Politics, and was a junior college for future political leaders. Thirteen years later, in 1959, the school became a "comprehensive university" and was renamed to Konkuk University (from ).

In 2016, Konkuk University celebrated its 70th anniversary. A new emblem featuring Sanghuh Hall, the original building for the Chosun School of Politics, was released in December 2015. The university also unveiled a second ox statue and held a major academic symposium.

In 2017, Konkuk University was selected for the Leaders in Industry-University Cooperation (LINC+) project by the Ministry of Education and the National Research Foundation of Korea and has been accredited by the Korean University Accreditation Institute (KUAI), of the Korean Council for University Education, for two consecutive periods.

Administration and organization
Yoo served as the first president of Konkuk University from 1959 to 1961. In September 2016, Sanggi Min became the university's 20th president. The university has four executive vice presidents: provost and executive vice president for academic affairs, executive vice president for public affairs, executive vice president for research, and executive vice president for medicine. The board of the Konkuk University Foundation, which governs the university, includes Chairperson Ja-eun Yoo and eleven other board members who each serve 4-year terms.

Academics

Undergraduate and graduate programs
As of 2021, the Seoul campus was composed of thirteen undergraduate colleges and thirteen graduate schools; the GLOCAL Campus in Chungju is composed of seven undergraduate colleges and four graduate schools.

Seoul Campus (undergraduate)
 College of Liberal Arts
 College of Science
 College of Architecture
 College of Engineering
 College of Humanities and Social Sciences
 College of Business Administration
 College of Veterinary Medicine
 College of Art and Design
 College of Education
 Institute of Real Estate Science
 Institute of Convergence Science and Technology
 Sanghuh College of Life Sciences
 Sanghuh College of Liberal Arts

Seoul Campus (graduate)
 Graduate School (general)
 Graduate School of Architecture
 Graduate School of Law
 Graduate School of Business Administration
 Graduate School of Public Administration
 Graduate School of Education
 Graduate School of Industry
 Graduate School of Agriculture
 Graduate School of Journalism and Public Relations
 Graduate School of Information and Communication 
 Graduate School of Art and Design
 Graduate School of Real Estate
 Graduate School of Veterinary Epidemic Prevention

Chungju GLOCAL campus (undergraduate)
 College of Art and Design
 College of Humanities and Social Sciences Convergence
 College of Science and Technology
 College of Medical Life Sciences
 College of Medicine
 College of Liberal Arts
 College of Innovation Sharing

Chungju GLOCAL campus (graduate)
 Graduate School (general)
 Graduate School of Medicine
 Graduate School of Creative Convergence
 Graduate School of Education

Research institutes
Konkuk University has 58 affiliated and special research institutes in the areas of humanities, social sciences, and natural sciences.

Architectural Barrier-free Institute
Artificial Muscle Research Center
Asia Infrastructure Research Center
Bio Food & Drug Research Center
Bio/Molecular Informatics Center
Cancer and Metabolism Institute
Center for Animal Resources
Center for Eco-Informatics
Center for Emerging Market Global Companies
Center for IT Enabled Outsourcing
Center for SMART Space Technology Research
Center for Story & Image Telling Studies
Center for Wireless Transmission Technology
Climate Research Institute
Eco-Food Supply Institute
Eco-friendly Agriculture Products Certification Center
Epic and Literary Therapy Research Institute
Fairy Tales & Translation
Flexible Display Roll To Roll Research Center
Food Safety & Animal Health Research Center at Konkuk University, FSRCKU
Functional Glycoside Conjugater Research Center
Future Energy Research Center
Global & Local Research Institute
Glocal Institute for SMART Communication and Consilience
Glocal Institute of Disease Control
Humanities Research Institute
i-Fashion Technology Center
Institute for Advanced Physics
Institute for Comparative History of Korea and Taiwan
Institute for Conservation of Art
Institute for Smart Green Architecture and Urbanism
Institute for Ubiquitous Information Technology and Applications 
Institute of Biomedical and Health Science
Institute of Body & Culture
Institute of Functional Genomics
Institute of Glocal Disease Control
Institute of Inflammatory Diseases
Institute of Intelligent Vehicle and System Technology
Institute of Korean Politics and Society
Institute of Livestock Business Management
Institute of Public Affairs
Institute of Real Estate & Urban Studies
Institute of SMART Biotechnology
Institute of Technology Innovation
Institutional Animal Care and Use committee
Institutional Biosafety committee
International Climate and Environmental Research Center
Knowledge Contents Research Institute
Konkuk International Healthcare Institute
Konkuk SMART FTA Institute
Konkuk Social Policy Research Institute
Konkuk Trade & Tariff Institute
Konkuk University Public Design Research Center
Korea Aerospace Design·Air Worthiness Institute
Korea Hemp Institute
Korea Nokyong Research Center
Korea Sports Turfgrass Research Center
KU Institute of Communication Studies
KU Language and Cognition Research Center
Laboratory Animal Research Center
Life Resource Cooperative Research Institute
Liquid Crystals Research Center
Mathematical Science Research Center
Music Education Research Center
Nano Technology Research Center
New Media Art Laboratory
Physical Activity & Performance Institute
Quantum Institute for Emerging Technologies
Regional Development Design Center
Research Center for Innovative Electricity Market Technology
Research Center for Livestock Industry of North Korea
Research Center for Network and Energy Industries
Research Institute for Eco-based Society
Research Institute of animal models for diseases & stem cell
Research Institute of Art Culture
Research Institute of Basic Sciences
Research institute of Biomedical engineering
Research Institute of Economics & Management
Research Institute of Education
Research Institute of Food Biotechnology
Research Institute of Glocal Culture strategy
Research Institute of Industrial Technology
Research Institute of Inflammatory Diseases
Research Institute of Law
Research Institute of Life & Environment
Research Institute of Meat Science and Culture
Research Institute of Neurobiology
Research Institute of Social Sciences
Research Institute of Urban Administration
SK chemicals - KU Biomaterials Institute
SMART Institute of Advanced Biomedical Science
SMART SANGHUH Bio Research Institute
Social Eco-Tech Institute
Software Research Center
The Academy of Korea Horse Industry
The Center for Asia and Diaspora
The Center for Middle Eastern Studies
The Institute for the 3Rs
The Research Center for the Korean History of Technology
The Research Institute for Global Management of Technology for Catching Up
The Research Institute of Art and Design
The Research Institute of Medical Sciences
The Research Institute of Natural Science
The Study for Body Culture Institute
Veterinary Science Research Institute

Distinguished professors
Four renowned scholars held the position of distinguished professor as of the spring semester of 2018. 
Yongmin Cho, particle physicist
Roger D. Kornberg, Stanford University professor and 2006 Nobel Prize laureate in chemistry 
William F. Miller, Stanford University professor emeritus
Hans Robert Schöler, director of the Max Planck Institute for Molecular Biomedicine

Konkuk Language Institute
In 1990, Konkuk University Language Institute began to provide instruction in English and other foreign languages. Courses on Chinese, English, French, Japanese, Spanish, and Vietnamese are available to Konkuk University students and the general public. In 1998, the institute introduced Korean language programs for foreigners with short-term courses lasting 1–2 weeks, as well as longer 3-month courses. The institute also provides training for Korean language teachers.

Reputation and rankings

Times Higher Education (THE) University Ranks
WORLD: 2018 (#501-600), 2021 (#601-800)
Asia: 2013 (#92), 2021 (#114)
QS University Ranks
World: 2021 (#551-560) 
Asia: 2021 (#101)
Domestic rank and project selected by government and its scale of support fund 
 2022 Joong-Ang Ilbo News & Media's comprehensive ranking of university evaluations #7.
 5th place in 2019 Joong-Ang Ilbo Preference for Entrance (School Parents).
 Support of $1.62 million for 5 years for the Korea Research Foundation LINK+ project in 2017.
 Select BK21 Plus Project for 14 consecutive years in 2019 and select $2.07 million.
 The Ministry of Education's university innovation support project will be carried out for three years in 2019 with $12.1 million worth of projects.
 Project to support Humanities Korea Plus (HK+) was selected for 11 consecutive years in 2019 and is worth $6.7 million.
 13 years in a row to support universities that contribute to high school education in 2019 and worth $10.9 million.
 Support $5.3 million for four years of selection of SW-centered university project in 2018.
 Top 5 in 2019 NCSI Customer Satisfaction Assessment (private college).

International programs

Konkuk University has entered into partnership agreements with 645 institutions in 68 countries. In 2019, a total of 690 students studied abroad through dual degree programs, exchange programs, language courses, and short-term programs, and 730 foreign students were registered at the university.

Exchange student program
Foreign students enrolled in Konkuk University's partner universities—such as UC Berkeley in the United States, University of Edinburgh in the United Kingdom, Erasmus University Rotterdam in the Netherlands, and Osaka University in Japan—can pursue their studies at the main Seoul campus for one or two semesters. Students are selected in accordance with the terms and conditions specified in the partnership agreements and only pay tuition to their home institutions.

International Summer Program and International Winter Program
The International Summer Program and International Winter Program are two-week long programs that provide opportunities for foreign students wishing to learn about Korea and experience its culture. Students can take classes on Korean history, culture, and business practices, and participate in field trips and cultural events.

Undergraduate degree-seeking program qualifications
Freshman Applicants (first grade): Applicants and their parents are foreign nationals without Korean citizenship (foreigners - non-Korean nationals, including dual nationalities). Applicants have graduated or are expected to graduate from accredited primary and secondary schools overseas (12-year education).
Transfer Applicants (third grade): Applicants have completed or are expected to complete at least 2 years of a 4-year undergraduate degree program with at least 50 percent of the credits required for graduation at an accredited Korean or foreign university with good academic standing. Applicants have graduated or are expected to graduate from a 2 or 3-year associate degree program at an accredited Korean or foreign college with good academic standing (except Hong Kong and Macao).
Language Proficiency Requirements: All applicants must submit one or more of the following documents: Applicant with a Grade 3 or higher in Korean Language Proficiency Test (TOPIK), Korean Language Program Completion Certificate issued by Konkuk Language Institute with Level 3 or above.

Graduate degree-seeking program qualifications
Common Qualifications: The applicant must meet one of the following nationality requirements:
A foreigner whose parents are both foreigners.
A person who has completed all levels of education equivalent to elementary, junior high, high school, and undergraduate school in a foreign country.
Language Proficiency: The applicant must meet one of the following language proficiency requirements:
Korean Language Proficiency Test (TOPIK) Level 3 or higher
Completed Korean language level 3 or higher at Konkuk University Language Institute
A certain level of official test of English language proficiency (refer to admission guidelines for required scores)
If the applicant can speak only English and no Korean, he/she must consult with the department before application is processed to see whether the department will accept the application or not (required).
In case applicant does not meet the language requirements, they can be exempted from the language proficiency requirement for a certain period at the entrance stage with the study permit and recommendation by a KU professor of the respected department or program. The applicant requests to check specific requirements for certain departments - Dept. of Korean Language & Literature, Dept. of International Commerce & Business, Dept. of Clothing, and Dept. of Literature & Art Therapy.

MA Program
 A bachelor's degree from an accredited college or university and educational attainment equivalent to a bachelor's degree approved by the law of the country of residence.

Ph.D. Program
 A master's degree from an accredited college or university and educational attainment equivalent to a master's degree approved by the law of the country of residence.

Campus

Konkuk University Museum
Established in 1963, Konkuk University Museum features 4,532 historical artifacts, including Dongguk Jeongun, one of the National Treasures of South Korea. The museum originated in Nagwon-dong, Jongno-gu, and in 1985 moved to the Sanghuh Memorial Hall, the building in which the Chosun School of Politics was founded. The museum is open to the public, and special lectures on Korean history and culture are given throughout the year.

Sanghuh Memorial Library
Sanghuh Memorial Library serves as Konkuk University's main library. Opened in 1989, it was the largest library in Asia at the time. As of February 2014, the library had more than 900,000 Korean books and 200,000 foreign language books. Six reading rooms with about 2,200 seats are available, and a reading room on the third floor of the library is open 24 hours a day. The library has interlibrary loan agreements with Korea University, Dongguk University, Sungkyunkwan University, Hanyang University, Hankuk University of Foreign Studies, and Chung-Ang University.

Ilgam Lake
Ilgam Lake is located at the center of Konkuk University's Seoul campus. This swamp was converted to an artificial lake when the university moved the campus from Nagwon-dong to the current location in 1954. In the 1950s and 1960s, indoor ice-skating rinks were uncommon, and the lake was used for national competitions. Occupying , the lake accounts for approximately one-ninth of the campus area. To maintain water quality, 650 tons of underground water is added daily, and a motorboat is used to prevent algal blooms.

Student life and university events
Konkuk University has more than 70 student clubs based on social and professional interests. At the beginning of the academic year in March, the Student Club Association holds a fair on campus to recruit new members.

Foundation Day is an annual ceremony that commemorates Yoo Seok-chang's founding of Konkuk University on May 15, 1946. It is held for students, faculty, staff, alumni, parents, and guests. Awards are presented to the faculty and staff who have contributed to the university. Around the same time, Konkuk University's student association organizes the Ilgam Lake Festival. This three-day long event features performances and exhibitions by college departments and student clubs. Famous K-pop celebrities are also invited to perform in a concert.

In late October, colleges and student clubs stage the Fall Art Festival to showcase their academic achievements and artistic talent. This three-day long event is organized by the Student Club Association.

Recent developments

PRIME Project 
On May 3, Konkuk University announced that it was selected by the Korean government to participate in the Program for Industrial Needs-Matched Education (PRIME). Higher education institutions receive incentives for restructuring and training students to meet the society's needs under the project. Of the 75 universities that applied, Konkuk University, Ewha Womans University, Hanyang University's ERICA campus, and 18 other universities were chosen. As a result, Konkuk University is expected to receive up to 450 billion won in government funding over three years until 2018. More than 15% will be allocated for scholarships, and a significant portion will be used to improve educational programs and build infrastructure.

Konkuk Institute of Technology 
In 2017, Konkuk University introduced the "Konkuk Institute of Technology" to train and prepare students for industries with significant growth potential. The institute includes eight departments in energy engineering, smart vehicle engineering, smart ICT engineering, cosmetics engineering, stem cell and regenerative biology, systems biotechnology, integrative bioscience and biotechnology, and biomedical science and engineering with 333 students. Konkuk University plans to offer a 5-year BS/MS program, through which all students will receive a scholarship for their graduate education as well as a stipend of 300,000 won per month for book purchases and research, at the institute. The registration fee for all incoming students will be waived.

Plus Semester System 
As an alternative to the prevalent 2-semester, 4-year undergraduate programs, Konkuk University introduced the Plus Semester System which will allow students to take initiative in designing their own curriculum. The innovative system is part of an effort to make university education more student-focused and tailored to meet changing industry demands. Konkuk students will be able to choose from a variety of options, including the 2+One-Semester On-The-Job Training program, 3+1 Employment program, 7+1 Self-Designed Semester program, and 4+1 Bachelor's and master's degree program. The 2+One-Semester program allows students to gain work experience during the semester and take classes to fulfill course requirements for their majors during the vacation. For the 7+1 program, students will design their plans for external activities prior to the beginning of the semester. The activities are to develop expertise in areas of interest rather than being limited to opening a new business or finding employment. Once the plans are approved, students receive up to 15 credits once they submit completion reports. The Center for Integrated Science and Technology, which will include four departments in biotechnology and another four in engineering, will offer the 4+1 Bachelor's and master's degree program.

Transportation

The Seoul campus is adjacent to the Konkuk University Station, which is serviced by Seoul Subway Line 2 and Line 7. The circular Line 2 offers easy access to downtown Seoul within one hour. Line 7 links the northern part of the city to the popular Gangnam District.

 Konkuk University Station
 Konkuk University Station

Seoul buses #240, #302, #721, #2222, #2223, #2224, #3216, #3220, and #4212 can be taken nearby the campus to different places in the city. From Incheon International Airport, Limousine Bus #6013 is available every 30–40 minutes from 6:15 a.m. to 10:55 p.m for ₩10,000.

Notable alumni

Academia
Shim Hwa-jin, president of Sungshin Women's University
Arts and literature
Kim Hyesoon, poet
Jeon Min-hee, fantasy writer
Shin Dong-yup, poet
Shin-ik Hahm, conductor
Business
Chris Nam, president of the Federation of Korean Associations, USA
Civil service, law, and politics
Jeong Ho-yong, politician
Kim Han-gil, politician
Entertainment

Popular culture
Konkuk University has been a popular film location for Korean dramas. Twenty Again, a 2015 Korean television series starring Choi Ji-woo and Lee Sang-yoon was filmed at the main campus in Seoul.

Cheese in the Trap, a popular "webtoon" published on Naver since 2010 with more than 1 million viewers, was written by Konkuk University alumnus . Many illustrations were based on Konkuk University buildings, including the museum and library.

Affiliates 
 Konkuk University Middle School
 Konkuk University High School
 Konkuk University Medical Center (KUMC): Located on the west side of the Seoul campus, the current state-of-the-art facility was opened in August 2005 with 875 beds. In 2011, the World Health Organization certified KUMC as a Health promoting hospital and the Korean government also designated KUMC as a “senior medical center” specializing in cancer and cardiovascular diseases. An international clinic for foreign patients has been operating since 2010.
 Konkuk Dairy & Ham
 Konkuk Asset Management Corporation
 The Classic 500
 Smart KU Golf Pavilion

See also 
 List of universities in Seoul

References

External links 
 Konkuk University - Official website
 Konkuk University - Glocal Campus

 
Universities and colleges in Seoul
Universities and colleges in North Chungcheong Province
1931 establishments in Korea
Educational institutions established in 1931
Private universities and colleges in South Korea
Gwangjin District